The following is a list of all team-to-team transactions that have occurred in the National Hockey League (NHL) during the 1938–39 NHL season. It lists which team each player has been traded to and for which player(s) or other consideration(s), if applicable.

Transactions 

Notes
 The Red Wings holding option of contract renewal.  Returned to Toronto after Detroit failed to renew contract on July 1, 1939.

References

Transactions
National Hockey League transactions